Ooruttambalam is a locality near Nemom, a suburban area of Trivandrum, capital of Kerala, India.

Geography
Ooruttambalam is 16 kilometers from Kerala State Road Transport Corporation's Central Bus Depot, Thampanoor, and City Depot East Fort. 

Regular bus services connect other parts of the city. It is 4 kilometers from National Highway 66. The nearest towns are Balaramapuram, Kattakada, and Neyyattinkara.

The railway station is located 3 kilometers away and connects Ooruttambalam to Kanyakumari and Thiruvananthapuram Central.

Neyyar dam, a tourist destination, is 16 km away. Its canal passes through the town and the water is used for agriculture.

History 

Temples

  Temple is located near  Market. Devotees from across the state visit. The '' and '' of the temple are famous.  has been celebrated during the Malayalam month  on the day of the  every year. People from all walks of life participate in the festival, including Hindus, Christians, and Muslims. The procession starts from the temple and moves through  and reaches  temple. From there it moves to  Junction,  Junction,  Junction and comes back to the temple. The elephants carry .

Valiyarthala Thampuran Temple is an ancient temple. Oorttu Festival, is very popular in this temple.

Infrastructure
The post office, bank, and the village office are near Ooruttambalam junction.

Education 
Two schools are there. A high school and an LP School are near Good Shepherd Church Velikkodu, built by Portuguese missionaries in 1917.

Sree Saraswathy Vidyalayam, CBSE is a subsidiary of Bharatheeya Vidya Nikethan, teaching students from Pre-KG to Plus Two.

Government 
The local government office (Panchayat office), a local branch of the main police station, is 1 km from Ooruttambalam.

Economy 
Krishnapuram is a good agricultural place in Ooruttambalam. Farmers work full-time in banana plants and coconut plants. 

Ooruttambalam Service Co-operative Bank is situated near the post office.

References

External links

 www.durgatemple.blogspot.com

Suburbs of Thiruvananthapuram
Villages in Thiruvananthapuram district